Joseph Phillip O'Keefe (26 May 1909 – 2 September 1995) was a Liberal party member of the House of Commons of Canada. He was an executive, manager/owner, supermarket and merchant by career. He was born in St. John's, Newfoundland.

He was first elected at the St. John's East riding in the 1963 general election, then re-elected for a second term in 1965. O'Keefe left Parliament after his defeat to James McGrath of the Progressive Conservative party in the 1968 election.

References

External links
 

1909 births
1995 deaths
Members of the House of Commons of Canada from Newfoundland and Labrador
Liberal Party of Canada MPs
Politicians from St. John's, Newfoundland and Labrador